The 1999–2000 Luxembourg National Division was the 86th season of top level association football in Luxembourg.

Overview
It was performed in 12 teams, and F91 Dudelange won the championship after a play off phase.

First phase

Table

Results

Second phase

Championship stage

Table

Results

Relegation stage

Group 1

Table

Results

Group 2

Table

Results

References
Luxembourg - List of final tables (RSSSF)

Luxembourg National Division seasons
Luxembourg
1999–2000 in Luxembourgian football